The Saleen 1, also called the Saleen S1, is a two-seater sports car developed and built by American automobile manufacturer Saleen Automotive. It was unveiled at the 2017 LA Auto Show, and is the first car developed entirely by Saleen since the Saleen S7 ended production in 2009. Production of the Saleen 1 is planned to be 1,500 units yearly, with a starting price of US$100,000 each.

Specifications

Powertrain 
The engine is mid-rear, transversely mounted and drives the rear wheels.

Transmission 
The Saleen 1 is equipped with a 6-speed manual transmission as standard, however a paddle shift automatic transmission is expected to be offered as an option.

Suspension 
The Saleen 1 uses double wishbone suspension on the front and rear axles of the vehicle, allowing for easier tuning of suspension kinematics and properties such as camber angle or toe.

Wheels 
The car is equipped with alloy wheels with diameters of 20 inches at the front and rear. The Continental tires have codes of 255/30 ZR 20 for the front and 335/25 ZR 20 for the rear. The brake calipers and rotors measure 15 inches in diameter at the front and the rear.

Interior features 
The interior of the Saleen 1 is finished mostly in leather, suede, and Alcantara. Other amenities include Sirius radio, Apple CarPlay, and a six-speaker sound system.

Performance
These acceleration times are achieved through a power-to-weight ratio of 0.17 hp/lb (0.28 kW/kg). The Saleen 1 is also capable of 1.2g of lateral acceleration in a turn.

Racing

Saleen Cup 
The Saleen Cup was launched in partnership with SRO Motorsports Group in 2019 to demonstrate the capabilities of the S1. A modified version of the Saleen 1, called the Saleen Cup car, is the exclusive car raced in the series. The Cup car features race-spec aerodynamics, FIA standard safety equipment, and slick racing tires. The Saleen Cup series consists of eight races at four tracks around the United States, listed below:

The 2020 Saleen Cup was cancelled the weekend before its scheduled opening event.

GT4 
Saleen plans to further modify the Saleen 1 Cup car for GT4 homologation for the 2020 season. Saleen's plan includes the introduction of a factory racing team, with at least one driver sourced from the winners of the summer 2019 Saleen Cup.

References

External links
Saleen 1 official website

2010s cars
Rear mid-engine, rear-wheel-drive vehicles
Saleen vehicles
Sports cars
Cars introduced in 2017